Alkiviadis Papageorgopoulos (born 24 March 1937) is a Greek former sports shooter. He competed at the 1960, 1964 and the 1968 Summer Olympics.

References

1937 births
Living people
Greek male sport shooters
Olympic shooters of Greece
Shooters at the 1960 Summer Olympics
Shooters at the 1964 Summer Olympics
Shooters at the 1968 Summer Olympics
Panathinaikos shooters
Sportspeople from Athens
20th-century Greek people